Waukena is a census-designated place in Tulare County, California, United States. Waukena has a post office with ZIP code 93282. The population was 108 at the 2010 census. Its name is possible derived from an archaic English interpretation of the Spanish name Joaquina.

Geography
According to the United States Census Bureau, the CDP covers an area of 0.9 square miles (2.4 km), all of it land.

Climate
According to the Köppen Climate Classification system, Waukena has a semi-arid climate, abbreviated "BSk" on climate maps.

Demographics
At the 2010 census Waukena had a population of 108. The racial makeup of Waukena was 86 (79.6%) White, 0 (0.0%) African American, 3 (2.8%) Native American, 0 (0.0%) Asian, 0 (0.0%) Pacific Islander, 19 (17.6%) from other races, and 0 (0.0%) from two or more races. Hispanic or Latino of any race were 45 people (41.7%).

The whole population lived in households, no one lived in non-institutionalized group quarters and no one was institutionalized.

There were 37 households, 17 (45.9%) had children under the age of 18 living in them, 18 (48.6%) were opposite-sex married couples living together, 4 (10.8%) had a female householder with no husband present, 3 (8.1%) had a male householder with no wife present.  There were 6 (16.2%) unmarried opposite-sex partnerships, and 1 (2.7%) same-sex married couples or partnerships. 8 households (21.6%) were one person and 4 (10.8%) had someone living alone who was 65 or older. The average household size was 2.92.  There were 25 families (67.6% of households); the average family size was 3.32.

The age distribution was 34 people (31.5%) under the age of 18, 14 people (13.0%) aged 18 to 24, 26 people (24.1%) aged 25 to 44, 27 people (25.0%) aged 45 to 64, and 7 people (6.5%) who were 65 or older.  The median age was 30.3 years. For every 100 females, there were 125.0 males.  For every 100 females age 18 and over, there were 89.7 males.

There were 45 housing units at an average density of 47.8 per square mile, of the occupied units 15 (40.5%) were owner-occupied and 22 (59.5%) were rented. The homeowner vacancy rate was 0%; the rental vacancy rate was 8.3%.  39 people (36.1% of the population) lived in owner-occupied housing units and 69 people (63.9%) lived in rental housing units.

References

Census-designated places in Tulare County, California
Census-designated places in California